The 2006–07 New York Rangers season was the franchise's 80th season of play and their 81st season overall. It saw the team attempting to build on their surprising run into the playoffs the previous season.

After being swept by their cross-river rivals the New Jersey Devils in the first round of the 2006 Stanley Cup playoffs, the Rangers looked to add playoff experience through off-season free agent signings.  As such, the Rangers signed forward Matt Cullen and defenseman Aaron Ward from the Stanley Cup champion Carolina Hurricanes, in addition to three-time champion Brendan Shanahan from the Detroit Red Wings.  However, the Rangers lost a few big names from their strong regular season run, including assistant captain Steve Rucchin, Martin Rucinsky, Tom Poti and Petr Sykora.

Regular season
On October 5, 2006, before the Rangers opened regular season play at Madison Square Garden against the Washington Capitals, Jágr was named as the 24th captain in Rangers history. In the 5–2 victory, Jaromir Jagr scored on the season's first shot and Brendan Shanahan scored twice to tally his 600th career NHL goal.  Despite a 2–0 start, the Rangers struggled through the month of October and finished the calendar month in the midst of their west coast swing with a 5–6 record.

Things began to turn in the right direction for the team in the month of November.  The Rangers began the month with wins over the Anaheim Ducks and San Jose Sharks to bring their record above .500 and after an 8–3–3-month, the Rangers had a 13–9–3 record.

The Rangers rose high in December, with a five-game winning streak during the second week, but then crashed hard back to Earth. A 9–2 loss at Toronto on December 16 keyed a seven-game losing streak which included two heart-breaking losses in Florida (one to the Panthers in which the Rangers led 2–0 after two periods and lost 3–2 and another two nights later to the Lightning in which the Rangers led 3–0 after two and lost 4–3).  The Rangers were also shut-out in their final two losses of the streak.  The Rangers got back on the right track and snapped their losing skid with a 4–1 win against the Washington Capitals in their final game of 2006. This win would key a four-game winning streak; however, the Rangers lost eight of their next 11 games as they limped into February.

On February 5, 2007, in a trade with the Los Angeles Kings, the Rangers acquired the agitator Sean Avery.  Avery's first few games with the Rangers saw an increase in the team's intensity, but still a lack of luck in the standings.  In his first game, the Rangers lost to the New Jersey Devils 3–2 in a shootout, then proceeded to win three straight against the likes of Tampa Bay, Washington and Carolina.

Against the Philadelphia Flyers on February 17, the Rangers lost not only the game (5–3) but also lost Brendan Shanahan to a concussion after an open ice collision with Mike Knuble in the third period.  Shanahan would miss the next 15 games.  As of the trading deadline on February 27, the Rangers were 29–27–6 and a run at a playoff berth looked unlikely.

During the month of March, the Rangers lost a number of other players to injury, including Fedor Tyutin, Marcel Hossa and Karel Rachunek, all to medial collateral ligament (MCL) sprains.  However, thanks to the stellar play of goaltender Henrik Lundqvist, the Rangers went 10–2–3 in the month of March to move into playoff position and on April 5, 2007, with a 3–1 win over the Montreal Canadiens, clinched a playoff berth for the second consecutive season.  The Rangers concluded the regular season with a record of 13–3–4 after the trading deadline and 17–6–6 after the acquisition of Sean Avery from Los Angeles.

On their final night of the regular season, the Rangers lost 2–1 to the Pittsburgh Penguins, but thanks to Tampa Bay's shootout loss to the Atlanta Thrashers, the Rangers locked up the sixth seed in the Eastern Conference playoffs for the second straight year.

Season standings

Schedule and results

|- align="center" bgcolor="#CCFFCC"
| 1 || 5 || Washington Capitals || 5 – 2 || Lundqvist || 1-0-0
|- align="center" bgcolor="#CCFFCC"
| 2 || 7 || @ Philadelphia Flyers || 5 – 4 SO || Lundqvist || 2-0-0
|- align="center" bgcolor="#FFBBBB"
| 3 || 10 || Philadelphia Flyers || 4 – 2 || Lundqvist || 2-1-0
|- align="center" bgcolor="#FFBBBB"
| 4 || 12 || Pittsburgh Penguins || 6 – 5 || Lundqvist || 2-2-0
|- align="center" bgcolor="#FFBBBB"
| 5 || 14 || @ Buffalo Sabres || 7 – 4 || Weekes || 2-3-0
|- align="center" bgcolor="#CCFFCC"
| 6 || 16 || New Jersey Devils || 4 – 2 || Lundqvist || 3-3-0
|- align="center" bgcolor="#FFBBBB"
| 7 || 18 || Nashville Predators || 3 – 0 || Lundqvist || 3-4-0
|- align="center" bgcolor="#CCFFCC"
| 8 || 21 || @ Toronto Maple Leafs || 5 – 4 SO || Lundqvist || 4-4-0
|- align="center" bgcolor="#FFBBBB"
| 9 || 25 || Florida Panthers || 4 – 2 || Lundqvist || 4-5-0
|- align="center" bgcolor="#CCFFCC"
| 10 || 28 || @ Phoenix Coyotes || 7 – 3 || Lundqvist || 5-5-0
|- align="center" bgcolor="#FFBBBB"
| 11 || 30 || @ Los Angeles Kings || 4 – 1 || Lundqvist || 5-6-0
|-

|- align="center" bgcolor="#CCFFCC"
| 12 || 1 || @ Anaheim Ducks || 4 – 3 OT || Weekes || 6-6-0
|- align="center" bgcolor="#CCFFCC"
| 13 || 2 || @ San Jose Sharks || 3 – 1 || Weekes || 7-6-0
|- align="center" bgcolor="white"
| 14 || 5 || Buffalo Sabres || 4 – 3 OT || Weekes || 7-6-1
|- align="center" bgcolor="#CCFFCC"
| 15 || 8 || @ Florida Panthers || 4 – 3 SO || Lundqvist || 8-6-1
|- align="center" bgcolor="#CCFFCC"
| 16 || 10 || @ Atlanta Thrashers || 5 – 2 || Lundqvist || 9-6-1
|- align="center" bgcolor="#FFBBBB"
| 17 || 11 || @ Washington Capitals || 3 – 1 || Lundqvist || 9-7-1
|- align="center" bgcolor="#CCFFCC"
| 18 || 14 || New Jersey Devils || 3 – 2 || Lundqvist || 10-7-1
|- align="center" bgcolor="#FFBBBB"
| 19 || 15 || @ Carolina Hurricanes || 2 – 1 || Weekes || 10-8-1
|- align="center" bgcolor="#FFBBBB"
| 20 || 18 || @ Pittsburgh Penguins || 3 – 1 || Lundqvist || 10-9-1
|- align="center" bgcolor="#CCFFCC"
| 21 || 19 || Tampa Bay Lightning || 4 – 1 || Lundqvist || 11-9-1
|- align="center" bgcolor="#CCFFCC"
| 22 || 21 || Carolina Hurricanes || 4 – 0 || Lundqvist || 12-9-1
|- align="center" bgcolor="#CCFFCC"
| 23 || 25 || @ Pittsburgh Penguins || 2 – 1 OT || Lundqvist || 13-9-1
|- align="center" bgcolor="white"
| 24 || 26 || Buffalo Sabres || 3 – 2 OT || Lundqvist || 13-9-2
|- align="center" bgcolor="white"
| 25 || 28 || Atlanta Thrashers || 5 – 4 OT || Lundqvist || 13-9-3
|-

|- align="center" bgcolor="white"
| 26 || 1 || @ Buffalo Sabres || 4 – 3 SO || Weekes || 13-9-4
|- align="center" bgcolor="#FFBBBB"
| 27 || 3 || New York Islanders || 7 – 4 || Weekes || 13-10-4
|- align="center" bgcolor="#CCFFCC"
| 28 || 7 || Pittsburgh Penguins || 3 – 2 SO || Lundqvist || 14-10-4
|- align="center" bgcolor="#CCFFCC"
| 29 || 9 || @ Ottawa Senators || 3 – 1 || Lundqvist || 15-10-4
|- align="center" bgcolor="#CCFFCC"
| 30 || 10 || Florida Panthers || 2 – 1 || Weekes || 16-10-4
|- align="center" bgcolor="#CCFFCC"
| 31 || 12 || @ Philadelphia Flyers || 3 – 1 || Weekes || 17-10-4
|- align="center" bgcolor="#CCFFCC"
| 32 || 14 || @ Dallas Stars || 5 – 2 || Lundqvist || 18-10-4
|- align="center" bgcolor="#FFBBBB"
| 33 || 16 || @ Toronto Maple Leafs || 9 – 2 || Lundqvist || 18-11-4
|- align="center" bgcolor="#FFBBBB"
| 34 || 17 || New Jersey Devils || 6 – 1 || Weekes || 18-12-4
|- align="center" bgcolor="#FFBBBB"
| 35 || 19 || New York Islanders || 4 – 3 || Weekes || 18-13-4
|- align="center" bgcolor="#FFBBBB"
| 36 || 21 || @ Florida Panthers || 3 – 2 || Weekes || 18-14-4
|- align="center" bgcolor="#FFBBBB"
| 37 || 23 || @ Tampa Bay Lightning || 4 – 3 || Lundqvist || 18-15-4
|- align="center" bgcolor="#FFBBBB"
| 38 || 26 || @ New York Islanders || 2 – 0 || Lundqvist || 18-16-4
|- align="center" bgcolor="#FFBBBB"
| 39 || 29 || @ Ottawa Senators || 1 – 0 || Lundqvist || 18-17-4
|- align="center" bgcolor="#CCFFCC"
| 40 || 30 || Washington Capitals || 4 – 1 || Lundqvist || 19-17-4
|-

|- align="center" bgcolor="#CCFFCC"
| 41 || 2 || @ New Jersey Devils || 3 – 2 SO || Lundqvist || 20-17-4
|- align="center" bgcolor="#CCFFCC"
| 42 || 4 || Philadelphia Flyers || 3 – 2 || Lundqvist || 21-17-4
|- align="center" bgcolor="#CCFFCC"
| 43 || 6 || @ Montreal Canadiens || 4 – 3 || Lundqvist || 22-17-4
|- align="center" bgcolor="#FFBBBB"
| 44 || 9 || New York Islanders || 5 – 3 || Lundqvist || 22-18-4
|- align="center" bgcolor="#FFBBBB"
| 45 || 11 || Ottawa Senators || 6 – 4 || Lundqvist || 22-19-4
|- align="center" bgcolor="#CCFFCC"
| 46 || 13 || Boston Bruins || 3 – 1 || Lundqvist || 23-19-4
|- align="center" bgcolor="#FFBBBB"
| 47 || 16 || @ New Jersey Devils || 1 – 0 || Lundqvist || 23-20-4
|- align="center" bgcolor="#FFBBBB"
| 48 || 20 || Atlanta Thrashers || 3 – 1 || Lundqvist || 23-21-4
|- align="center" bgcolor="#CCFFCC"
| 49 || 27 || @ Philadelphia Flyers || 2 – 1 || Lundqvist || 24-21-4
|- align="center" bgcolor="#CCFFCC"
| 50 || 29 || @ Boston Bruins || 6 – 1 || Lundqvist || 25-21-4
|- align="center" bgcolor="#FFBBBB"
| 51 || 31 || Toronto Maple Leafs || 2 – 1 || Lundqvist || 25-22-4
|-

|- align="center" bgcolor="#FFBBBB"
| 52 || 3 || @ Tampa Bay Lightning || 3 – 2 || Lundqvist || 25-23-4
|- align="center" bgcolor="#FFBBBB"
| 53 || 5 || Detroit Red Wings || 4 – 3 || Lundqvist || 25-24-4
|- align="center" bgcolor="white"
| 54 || 6 || @ New Jersey Devils || 3 – 2 SO || Lundqvist || 25-24-5
|- align="center" bgcolor="#CCFFCC"
| 55 || 9 || Tampa Bay Lightning || 5 – 0 || Lundqvist || 26-24-5
|- align="center" bgcolor="#CCFFCC"
| 56 || 10 || @ Washington Capitals || 5 – 2 || Lundqvist || 27-24-5
|- align="center" bgcolor="#CCFFCC"
| 57 || 15 || @ Carolina Hurricanes || 4 – 1 || Lundqvist || 28-24-5
|- align="center" bgcolor="#FFBBBB"
| 58 || 17 || Philadelphia Flyers || 5 – 3 || Valiquette || 28-25-5
|- align="center" bgcolor="#CCFFCC"
| 59 || 18 || Chicago Blackhawks || 2 – 1 || Lundqvist || 29-25-5
|- align="center" bgcolor="#FFBBBB"
| 60 || 20 || @ New Jersey Devils || 2 – 1 || Lundqvist || 29-26-5
|- align="center" bgcolor="white"
| 61 || 22 || New Jersey Devils || 3 – 2 SO || Lundqvist || 29-26-6
|- align="center" bgcolor="#FFBBBB"
| 62 || 24 || Columbus Blue Jackets || 3 – 2 || Lundqvist || 29-27-6
|- align="center" bgcolor="#CCFFCC"
| 63 || 27 || Montreal Canadiens || 4 – 0 || Lundqvist || 30-27-6
|-

|- align="center" bgcolor="white"
| 64 || 1 || Pittsburgh Penguins || 4 – 3 SO || Lundqvist || 30-27-7
|- align="center" bgcolor="#CCFFCC"
| 65 || 3 || St. Louis Blues || 3 – 2 SO || Valiquette || 31-27-7
|- align="center" bgcolor="#CCFFCC"
| 66 || 5 || New York Islanders || 2 – 1 SO || Lundqvist || 32-27-7
|- align="center" bgcolor="#CCFFCC"
| 67 || 8 || @ New York Islanders || 2 – 1 || Lundqvist || 33-27-7
|- align="center" bgcolor="white"
| 68 || 10 || @ Pittsburgh Penguins || 3 – 2 OT || Lundqvist || 33-27-8
|- align="center" bgcolor="#CCFFCC"
| 69 || 11 || Carolina Hurricanes || 2 – 1 SO || Lundqvist || 34-27-8
|- align="center" bgcolor="#FFBBBB"
| 70 || 13 || Ottawa Senators || 3 – 2 || Lundqvist || 34-28-8
|- align="center" bgcolor="white"
| 71 || 16 || @ Atlanta Thrashers || 2 – 1 OT || Lundqvist || 34-28-9
|- align="center" bgcolor="#CCFFCC"
| 72 || 17 || Boston Bruins || 7 – 0 || Lundqvist || 35-28-9
|- align="center" bgcolor="#CCFFCC"
| 73 || 19 || Pittsburgh Penguins || 2 – 1 || Lundqvist || 36-28-9
|- align="center" bgcolor="#CCFFCC"
| 74 || 21 || Philadelphia Flyers || 5 – 0 || Lundqvist || 37-28-9
|- align="center" bgcolor="#CCFFCC"
| 75 || 24 || @ Boston Bruins || 2 – 1 SO || Lundqvist || 38-28-9
|- align="center" bgcolor="#CCFFCC"
| 76 || 25 || @ New York Islanders || 2 – 1 OT || Lundqvist || 39-28-9
|- align="center" bgcolor="#FFBBBB"
| 77 || 27 || @ Montreal Canadiens || 6 – 4 || Valiquette || 39-29-9
|- align="center" bgcolor="#CCFFCC"
| 78 || 31 || @ Philadelphia Flyers || 6 – 4 || Lundqvist || 40-29-9
|-

|- align="center" bgcolor="#CCFFCC"
| 79 || 1 || Toronto Maple Leafs || 7 – 2 || Lundqvist || 41-29-9
|- align="center" bgcolor="white"
| 80 || 3 || @ New York Islanders || 3 – 2 SO || Lundqvist || 41-29-10
|- align="center" bgcolor="#CCFFCC"
| 81 || 5 || Montreal Canadiens || 3 – 1 || Lundqvist || 42-29-10
|- align="center" bgcolor="#FFBBBB"
| 82 || 7 || @ Pittsburgh Penguins || 2 – 1 || Lundqvist || 42-30-10
|-

Playoffs 

The New York Rangers ended the 2006–07 regular season as the Eastern Conference's sixth seed.

Key:  Win  Loss

Eastern Conference Quarter-finals: vs. (3) Atlanta Thrashers

Entering the 2007 Stanley Cup playoffs, the New York Rangers had not won a playoff game since May 18, 1997, against the Philadelphia Flyers, having lost seven consecutive playoff games in that time span.  They began the Eastern Conference Quarter-finals against the Atlanta Thrashers, a team making their first playoff appearance in franchise history.

In front of a sellout crowd in Atlanta for Game 1, the Rangers struck first with a Jaromir Jagr goal 12:50 into the first period to take a 1–0 lead.  Michal Rozsival added a power play goal four minutes later to extend the Ranger lead to 2–0.  Atlanta's Eric Belanger tallied a power play goal in the first period's final minute to make the score 2–1 at first intermission.  The Rangers held a two-goal lead two other times through the remainder of the game, but Atlanta cut the deficit back to one on both occasions, with their final tally coming from former Ranger Pascal Dupuis early in the third period.  Atlanta pressured for the equalizer for the final minutes but could not beat Henrik Lundqvist for a fourth goal and the Rangers prevailed 4–3.  Not only was the victory the Rangers first playoff win in nearly ten years, it was also the first time the Rangers won Game 1 of a playoff series since the 1994 Eastern Conference Semi-finals against the Washington Capitals.  In addition, the four goals scored by New York in Game 1 matched their four-game offensive output against the New Jersey Devils from the year prior.

Atlanta switched goaltenders for Game 2, giving the nod to Johan Hedberg over Kari Lehtonen.  The Rangers would strike first again, this time on a fluke goal credited to Sean Avery.  Avery dumped the puck into the offensive zone from the red line, causing Hedberg to leave the crease in order to play the puck behind the net.  The puck caromed off the boards in a peculiar manner and ended up in the net.  After the bizarre goal, the game settled into a goaltending duel between Hedberg and Lundqvist.  Atlanta would tie the game five minutes into the third period on a goal by Ilya Kovalchuk.  The Rangers, however, would prevail, winning on a Brendan Shanahan goal with four minutes to play.

Up 2–0 in the series, the Rangers returned home for Game 3, and the Atlanta Thrashers returned to Kari Lehtonen in net.  The switch did not work, as the Rangers struck 32 seconds into the game and would not let up from there.  Jaromir Jagr tied an NHL record with three assists in the first period as Michael Nylander scored twice and Marek Malik added another to give New York a 3–0 lead after one.  Rookie Ryan Callahan scored twice in the second period (the first two playoff goals of his career), Brendan Shanahan added a power play goal midway through the third period, and Nylander completed the hat trick seven minutes later to seal a 7–0 Game 3 victory.  The 7–0 victory was the first playoff shutout in Henrik Lundqvist's career and the largest margin of victory in a playoff shutout in franchise history.

Atlanta switched back to Hedberg in Game 4 and struck first to take their first lead of the series with a Keith Tkachuk goal in the first period.  The Rangers would respond just over a minute later with Michal Rozsival's second power play goal of the series to make the score 1–1 after one period.  Atlanta would take the lead for a second time in the second period on a goal by Greg de Vries, but the Rangers would counter again, this time with a Brendan Shanahan goal to tie the game at 2–2 after two periods.  Early in the third period Matt Cullen would score the eventual game winner, driving a rolling puck from the point off the crossbar.  The puck bounced straight down and at first glance never crossed the goal line.  After a five-minute video review, the puck was clearly shown to have crossed the line in its entirety while on edge and the goal counted.  Jaromir Jagr added an empty net goal late in the period to seal a 4–2 win and a series sweep.  The sweep was only the third sweep of a seven-game playoff series in franchise history (the other sweeps came against the Chicago Blackhawks in 1972 and the New York Islanders in 1994).

Eastern Conference Semi-finals: vs. (1) Buffalo Sabres

After sweeping Atlanta in the first round, the Rangers next opponent was the Eastern Conference's top seed (and the regular season Presidents' Trophy winner), the Buffalo Sabres.  The Sabres had been a powerful offensive team in the regular season, scoring 308 goals in the 82 games (20 more than the second place team in that department, the Ottawa Senators with 288).  The Sabres had four players score over 30 goals during the season, led by Thomas Vanek with 43 in his sophomore campaign.

The series did not start well for the Rangers in western New York.  Despite playing a scoreless first period, the key development in the first twenty minutes was a knee injury suffered by Ranger defenseman Michal Rozsival.  Rozsival would see the ice for two shifts in the second period but could not stay in the game.  As a result, the Rangers were forced to play the remainder of the game with five defensemen, a recipe for disaster against a team as talented offensively as the Sabres.  Indeed, the result was a disaster for New York, as the Sabres struck for three goals in four minutes, two coming from the aforementioned Vanek, and Buffalo led 3–0 after two.  The Rangers finally beat Ryan Miller halfway through the third period to cut the deficit to 3–1, thanks to a Marcel Hossa tally, but it would not be enough.  Three minutes later Jason Pominville was awarded a goal on the first of several controversial video reviews in the series; the controversy in this case coming from the appearance that Pominville had punched the puck into the net. Brendan Shanahan scored a power play goal late for the Rangers to make it 4–2, but Drew Stafford hit the empty net to seal a 5–2 Sabre victory in Game 1.

The tide turned slightly for the Rangers in Game 2, but the result would not.  The Rangers scored first this time around, on a Martin Straka power play goal midway through the first, but Brian Campbell and the Sabres responded with a goal on the man advantage 50 seconds later to even the game at one.  Late in the second period, the Rangers scored again on the power play, this time with Paul Mara getting the tally, to take a 2–1 lead at second intermission.  Things would unravel for the Rangers in the third as an errant Marek Malik pass was intercepted before exiting the defensive zone and Chris Drury converted the play into the equalizer goal 24 seconds into the period.  Buffalo carried the momentum from there and Thomas Vanek netted the eventual game winner after a scramble in front at 10:11 of the third.  The Sabres hung on to win 3–2 and take a 2–0 lead into the series.

The series shifted to New York City and Madison Square Garden for Game 3, with the Rangers in desperate need of a victory.  For the second time in three games in the series, the game remained scoreless after one period of play; however, the Rangers struck early in the second, shortly after a power play opportunity had expired.  Marek Malik kept the puck in at the blue line and Jaromir Jagr fired a shot that Ryan Miller stopped and thought he had covered.  Unfortunately for the Sabres, the puck slipped behind him and Jagr followed up on the play by putting the loose puck in for his first goal of the series, giving the Rangers the 1–0 lead.  A few minutes later, after driving hard to the net Karel Rachunek appeared to have given the Rangers a 2–0 lead when the puck deflected off his skate and past Miller into the open net.  After a second controversial video review, the officials determined that Rachunek had kicked the puck into the net, negating the goal. Said Rangers Head Coach Tom Renney after the game, "it has to be a distinct kicking motion.  If that's distinct then we're all in trouble."  In the third, Buffalo would even the score with a power play goal by co-captain Daniel Briere with under eight minutes to play in regulation, forcing overtime.  Buffalo nearly buried the game in the first overtime session 19 minutes in while shorthanded, but Derek Roy's shot rang off the post behind Rangers netminder Henrik Lundqvist and out.  In double overtime, it was Rozsival who would be the hero for New York, scoring on a drive from the point that deflected off the iron and in behind Ryan Miller, ending the game after 36:43 of extra time.  The win came 36 years to the day that Pete Stemkowski scored a triple overtime winner at the Garden to beat the Chicago Blackhawks in 1971.

Two days later, the Rangers looked to even up the series on home ice, taking momentum from their double overtime Game 3 victory.  Game 4 started similarly: after a scoreless first period, Jaromir Jagr scored a goal early in the first minute of the second period to give the Rangers a 1–0 lead.  The Rangers would extend their lead to 2–0 midway through the third period, thanks to a power play goal from Brendan Shanahan.  Buffalo would cut their deficit back to one goal just 33 seconds later on a goal by Ales Kotalik.  Buffalo attacked hard for the game's final ten minutes but Lundqvist kept the Rangers up by a goal.  The Sabres outshot the Rangers 11–4 in the game's final frame.  With 20 seconds to play in regulation, Lundqvist was caught out of the net after misplaying the puck behind his own net as Buffalo charged for the equalizer.  The puck came to Daniel Briere at the side of the net, but Lundqvist came across and made a right pad save at the goal line with 17 seconds to play.  The play would go to another controversial video review and while many analysts believe that the puck logically would have crossed the goal line (resulting in a goal), there was no video angle available to conclusively prove that point.  The ruling was no goal and the Rangers hung on for their second straight 2–1 victory to even the series 2–2 as it went back to Buffalo.

After an even first period in Game 5 resulted in no scoring, the momentum swung heavily in the Sabres' favor.  Buffalo outshot New York 17–6 in the second period, but both goaltenders were a wall in net and the game remained scoreless through two.  In the third, Buffalo had the advantage in shots once more (13–6), but it was New York that struck first, as Martin Straka scored to put the Rangers on top 1–0 with 3:19 to play in regulation.  The Rangers looked like they were about to steal Game 5, but Chris Drury scored with 7.7 seconds remaining in the game to force overtime.  Coincidentally, the Rangers had been burned for a game-tying goal with exactly 7.7 seconds on the clock in the past, specifically in Game 7 of the 1994 Eastern Conference Finals when Valeri Zelepukin beat Mike Richter to force overtime.  While the Rangers had won that game in double overtime on a Stephane Matteau wrap-around, in this case, the Sabres would ride their momentum and win four minutes into overtime on a power play goal by Maxim Afinogenov, who had been a healthy scratch the game before.

Down 3–2 in the series, the Rangers headed back to New York for Game 6, carrying a nine-game winning streak at Madison Square Garden.  For the fifth straight game in the series, the Rangers drew first blood, on a Michael Nylander backhand shot.  With the score 1–0 Rangers in the second period, Buffalo started a heavy offensive onslaught. 1:29 into the second, Dmitri Kalinin scored on a shot that changed directions on Lundqvist after forward Nigel Dawes attempted to block the shot.  Buffalo took the lead just over a minute later on a Jason Pominville goal.  The Rangers would respond quickly, thanks to a power play goal by Paul Mara to tie the score at 2, but the Sabres were not done.  Jochen Hecht and Chris Drury would add goals to give Buffalo a 4–2 lead after two periods.  During the regular season and playoffs to that point, the Sabres had a 40–0 record when leading by two goals after two periods, but the Rangers would challenge that early.  Jaromir Jagr scored on the power play five minutes into the third to cut the deficit to 4–3, but Hecht would net his second of the game ten minutes later on a tip-in in front to extend Buffalo's lead back to two goals.  With 2:51 to play, Michael Nylander would score his second of the game on the power play to cut it to one goal again, but the Rangers could not tie the game late, and Buffalo held on for a 5–4 victory to eliminate the Rangers in six games.

Player statistics
Skaters

Goaltenders

Goaltenders

†Denotes player spent time with another team before joining Rangers. Stats reflect time with Rangers only.
‡Traded mid-season. Stats reflect time with Rangers only.

Awards and records
 Lester Patrick Trophy: Brian Leetch & John Halligan

Team specific awards
 Frank Boucher Trophy (to the "most popular player on and off the ice"): Henrik Lundqvist
 Rookie of the Year: Daniel Girardi
 Ceil Saidel Memorial Award ("for dedication to the organization on and off the ice"): Brendan Shanahan
 Steven McDonald Extra Effort Award ("for the player that goes above and beyond the call of duty"): Jed Ortmeyer
 Rangers Good Guy Award (for "cooperation with the media"): Brendan Shanahan
 Lars-Erik Sjoberg Award (to the best rookie of training camp): Nigel Dawes and Brandon Dubinsky
 Rangers Most Valuable Player: Henrik Lundqvist
 Players' Player Award: Brendan Shanahan

Milestones

Transactions

Trades

Free agents acquired

Free agents lost

Received from waivers

Waiver losses

Draft picks
New York's picks at the 2006 NHL Entry Draft in Vancouver, British Columbia, at the General Motors Place.

Farm teams

Hartford Wolf Pack (AHL)
Hartford finished with a regular season record of 47–29–3–1 for a total of 98 points in the standings.  This snapped a three-year streak in which the team had finished the regular season with at least 100 points, though it marked the fourth consecutive season in which the Wolf Pack won at least 40 games.  Ryan Callahan led the team with 35 goals and 55 points on the season, earning him a spot on the AHL All-Rookie team for the season.  By the time Callahan had won the honor, however, he was already seeing 3rd line playing time in the NHL for the Rangers.  Goaltender Al Montoya finished fifth in the league in regular season goals against average at 2.30.

Regular season standings

Playoffs
As the second seed in the Atlantic Division, the Wolf Pack opened up the playoffs against the third seeded Providence Bruins.  With home ice advantage secured, Hartford won Game 1, 5–1, but fell behind early in Game 2 and lost 4–2.  With the series even and headed to Providence, the Wolf Pack reclaimed home ice advantage in the series thanks to a 5–2 victory in Game 3.  Providence evened the series again in Game 4 with a big 5–1 victory, but the Wolf Pack used a 26–save Al Montoya shutout in Game 5 (a 1–0 victory) to take a 3–2 series lead back home to Hartford.  Providence stayed alive in the series by winning Game 6 convincingly by a 5–2 score to force a seventh game.  Tied 3–3 in the third, the Bruins scored two goals in a span of 58 seconds to take a 5–3 lead which Hartford could not come back from, falling 5–4 and losing the series 4 games to 3.

Charlotte Checkers (ECHL)
Charlotte finished the regular season 42–27–1–2 for 87 points, making 2006–07 the third best regular season finish in franchise history (behind 93 points in 2001–02 and 94 points in 1995–96).  The Checkers also qualified for the playoffs for the third consecutive season.  In each of the past two years, the Checkers were eliminated in the third round of the Kelly Cup Playoffs.  Mark Lee led the team in scoring with 80 points, Bruce Graham led the team in goals with 33, and goaltender Chris Holt finished the season with a 24–18–0–2 record with a 3.15 goals against average.

Regular season standings

Playoffs
The fourth seeded Checkers played the fifth seeded Augusta Lynx in the American Conference's Southern Divisional Quarter-finals, a best-of-three series, sweeping it 2 games to 0.  Charlotte won both games in overtime, 2–1 in Game 1 and 3–2 on the road in Game 2.  Daymen Rycroft scored the game-winning goal on both occasions.

The Checkers would then play the top seeded Florida Everblades in the Divisional Semi-finals, a best-of-five series.  Florida took Game 1 by the score of 3–2, then pounded the Checkers in Game 2 by scoring early and often, en route to a 7–2 win.  Back home for Game 3, the Checkers could not stave off the sweep, falling 4–0 in their final game.

See also
 2006–07 NHL season

References

 Game log: New York Rangers game log on espn.com
 Team standings: NHL standings on espn.com
 Player Stats: New York Rangers 2006–07 Reg. Season Stats on espn.com
 Draft picks: 2006 NHL Entry Draft
 Official site of the New York Rangers

New York Rangers seasons
New York Rangers
New York Rangers
New York Rangers
New York Rangers
 in Manhattan
Madison Square Garden